Talmage may refer to:

People
 Given name
 Tal Bachman (born 1968), Canadian singer-songwriter
 Talmage Cooley (born 1965), American social entrepreneur and filmmaker
 Tal Farlow (1921–1998), American jazz guitarist

 Surname
 Algernon Talmage (1871–1939), British artist
 David Talmage (1919–2014), American immunologist
 James E. Talmage (1862–1933), American Mormon apostle, author, and academic
 John Van Nest Talmage (1819-1892), American Protestant missionary in China
 May Booth Talmage (1868–1944), American Mormon missionary in Europe
 Thomas De Witt Talmage (1832-1902), American preacher and writer

Places
United States
 Talmage, California
 Talmage, Kansas
 Talmage, Kentucky
 Talmage, Missouri
 Talmage City, Missouri
 Talmage, Nebraska
 Talmage, Pennsylvania
 Talmage, Utah

See also
 Tallmadge (disambiguation)
 Talmadge (disambiguation)
 Talmadge (surname)
Tal Bachman